The Grey Ministry was a responsible government that was formed in New Zealand. It formed in October 1877 and governed for two years until October 1879. From the outset, Sir George Grey served as Prime Minister.

Background
As Premier, Grey was highly active in promoting middle-class liberalism to New Zealanders sponsoring ideas such as electoral reform, land taxes, breaking up large estates, regulation of wages and working hours and accessible education. However his ideas were too radical for many of his contemporaries. Grey's administration was perceived as defective and his leadership poor. As he never had a safe majority in Parliament, Grey unsuccessfully asked for a dissolution in 1878. Soon after the economy began to slide into recession, which caused much unemployment and as a result, unpopularity. The next year Grey's government lost a division in the House triggering an election. Grey and his followers failed to win a majority and in October 1879 Grey resigned.

Ministers
The following members served in the Grey Ministry:

Notes

References

See also
 Government of New Zealand

Ministries of Queen Victoria
Governments of New Zealand
1877 establishments in New Zealand
1879 disestablishments in New Zealand
Grey Ministry
Grey Ministry